Swat Museum is a museum located in Mingora, on the Mingora  and Saidu road in Swat District, province of Khyber Pakhtunkhwa, Pakistan.

History 
The museum was conceived in 1959 under the aegis of the Italian Archaeological Mission to Swat and the Wali of Swat to contain his personal collection of artifacts. It was later expanded with the assistance of the Japanese government, but was badly damaged in the Kashmir earthquake of 2005. With the war between the Pakistan government and Taliban in 2007, the museum was closed and its contents were moved to Taxila, this proved lucky as a bomb exploded nearby in February 2008 killing many and damaging the museum. The 2,700 objects were returned to the museum in July 2011, and  a new seismic-resistant museum was opened on December 11, 2014.

Collection 

The museum contains Gandharan statuettes and friezes depicting the lives of the Buddha along with seals, small reliquaries and other treasures, mostly from Butkara No 1 and Udegram. Additionally, there are pre-Buddhist artefacts, and an ethnographic gallery with traditional carved Swati furniture, jewellery and embroideries. A recent discovery, includes a stone ‘board’ game found at the Buddhist Complex of Amluk-Dara, of a sort still played in the valley today.

References

External links 

 Swat Museum page on Directorate of Archaeology & Museums Khyber Pakhtunkhwa Pakistan

Museums in Khyber Pakhtunkhwa
Art museums and galleries in Pakistan
History museums in Pakistan
Tourist attractions in Swat
Swat District